Wangchengpo (West Bus Station) is a subway station in Changsha, Hunan, China, operated by the Changsha subway operator Changsha Metro.

Station layout
The station has one island platform.

History
The station opened on 29 April 2014.

Surrounding area
Hunan College of Finance and Economics
Hunan First Normal University
Changsha West Bus Station (Chinese: 长沙汽车西站)
Lugu Science and Technology Park (Chinese: 麓谷高新科技园)

References

Railway stations in Hunan
Railway stations in China opened in 2014